<onlyinclude>

February 2022

See also

References

killings by law enforcement officers
 02